A shot on goal may refer to, in various sports:

 Shot on goal (association football)
 Shot on goal (ice hockey)
 Shot on goal (lacrosse)